Adán Martín Menis (19 October 1943 – 10 October 2010) was president of the Canary Islands (Spain) from July 2003 until 2007.

Menis was born in Santa Cruz de Tenerife.  He was an industrial engineer and represented the Canarian Coalition party.

Menis was elected president in the autonomous elections of 2003.

He has also served as mayor of Santa Cruz de Tenerife from 1979 to 1987, the minister of public works in the island council of Tenerife from 1982 to 1986, a national deputy from 1993 to 1996, vice-president of the Canary Islands and president of the island of Tenerife from 1987 to 1999.

Death 
He died in Barcelona. His funeral was held on October 11, with a funeral procession from the chapel in the Government Building of the Canary Islands to the Church of the Conception of Santa Cruz de Tenerife. There Mass was celebrated by the Bishop of the Diocese of Tenerife, Bernardo Álvarez Afonso, and mass was attended by other civil authorities. From the Iglesia de la Concepción the coffin left for Santa Lastenia Cemetery. Adán Martín was the first regional president of Spain to die in times of democracy.

In 2011, the Auditorio de Tenerife, it was renamed to Auditorio de Tenerife "Adán Martín", as a tribute for having promoted its construction. But despite this, the building is still better known by its original name.

References

External links
 Biography of Adán Martín Menis (in Spanish)

1943 births
2010 deaths
People from Santa Cruz de Tenerife
Canarian Coalition politicians
Presidents of the Canary Islands
Members of the 6th Parliament of the Canary Islands